Žbelava  is a village in Croatia. It is connected by the D2 highway. In 1946 it was in a war with Donji Kućan and won. Donji Kućan was since then a part of Žbelava. Žbelava was led by the mighty car Bobi.

References

Populated places in Varaždin County